Downtown Long Beach is the heart of Long Beach, California, United States, and is the location for most of the city's major tourist attractions and municipal services. It is also the location for numerous businesses. There are many hotels and restaurants in the area that serve locals, tourists, and convention visitors.

Location

Downtown Long Beach is bounded by the Los Angeles River to the west, and Ocean Boulevard to the south (south of Ocean is considered the "Downtown Shoreline," a separate area). Alamitos Avenue roughly delimits downtown to the east, although the City's actual downtown zoning extends a few blocks east of Alamitos. Similarly, downtown effectively ends around 7th Street to the north, but the City's downtown zoning carries as far north as Anaheim Street between Pacific Avenue and Long Beach Boulevard, and up to 10th Street east of that.

The greater downtown area includes the neighborhoods of the East Village Arts District, the West End, North Pine, the Civic Center, and the "Downtown Core" or central business and entertainment area.

Tourist attractions and shopping
 Aquarium of the Pacific
 Catalina Express – boats to Catalina Island
 East Village Arts District
 Long Beach Convention and Entertainment Center
 Terrace Theater
 Long Beach Sports Arena (which has one of Wyland's Whaling Walls)
 Long Beach Plaza – shopping 
 Museum of Latin American Art
 The Pike – shopping
 Pine Avenue — restaurants and nightclubs
 Queen Mary – historic ship, hotel, restaurants & conventions (nearby)
 Rainbow Harbor – shopping and restaurants
 Shoreline Village – shopping and restaurants
 Harvey Milk Promenade Park

Events
 Second Saturday Art Walk (East Village)
 Third Fridays Twilight Walk (Historic Pine Avenue)
 Certified Organic Farmers Market (Fridays)
 Bob Marley Reggae Festival (February)
 Queen Mary Scottish Festival (February)
 Congressional Cup (sailing races, April)
 Long Beach Grand Prix & Formula DRIFT (April)
 Cajun & Zydeco Festival (May)
 Long Beach Lesbian & Gay Pride Parade & Festival (May)
 Aloha Concert Jam (Hawaiian music, June)
 Anime Expo or AX (SPJA) (Promotion of Japanese Animation & Culture July 2 to July 6)
 Catalina Ski Race (July)

2028 Summer Olympics

During the 2028 Summer Olympics, downtown Long Beach will host BMX racing, water polo, triathlon and open water swimming.

Government and infrastructure

Local government
 Long Beach City Hall
 Long Beach Police Dept. Headquarters
 Municipal Library

County, state, and federal representation
 Long Beach Main Post Office, located at 300 Long Beach Boulevard
 Los Angeles Superior Court Governor George Deukmejian Courthouse

Businesses
The Downtown Long Beach Alliance manages the business- and commercial property-based improvement districts in Downtown Long Beach.  There are approximately 1,500 businesses in Downtown Long Beach, including several law firms given the proximity of the Los Angeles County Courthouse, as well as over 150 restaurants, wine bars, performing arts venues, and the Long Beach Convention and Entertainment Center.  A complete and frequently updated business directory is available online at Downtown Long Beach Alliance's website.

The California State University system headquarters are at 401 Golden Shore in Downtown Long Beach.
 Long Beach Rescue Mission
 Long Beach World Trade Center
 Port of Long Beach (nearby)
 Molina Healthcare

Revitalization Projects
Outdated office buildings that have reached the end of their competitive life-cycle are finding a new beginning as residential conversions. In 2014 the city's Municipal Code provided for Adaptive Reuse, which is a "construction or remodeling project that reconfigures existing spaces, structures or buildings to accommodate a new use or to accommodate another purpose than what it was originally designed for." The City created the Adaptive Reuse Incentive Program to guide developers through the process. Re-purposing a building avoids demolition, sending the structure to landfills, while preserving the historic value and unique architecture of downtown Long Beach. 
Examples of buildings converted for reuse include the Verizon office building on 200 W. Ocean Blvd. in Long Beach which is changed into a mixed-use apartment building over retail.

The Long Beach Professional Building, an eight story poured in place concrete Art Deco medical office tower constructed in 1929 and once in danger of being torn down, was most recently renovated in 2018. The historic building is on the List of City of Long Beach Historic Landmarks and the California Office of Historic Preservation. The building was accepted in 2005 into the National Register of Historic Places. The restoration project was conducted by Global Premier Development and KTGY Architecture + Planning.  The structure is now called The Regency Palms, an assisted living and memory care facility.

Refer to the Downtown Update of the Long Beach Development Services for a presentation document showing completed, approved and pending projects.

Transportation
The following are located in Long Beach's downtown area:  
 A transit center of Long Beach Transit (bus)
 The southern terminus of Metro Rail's A Line: Downtown Long Beach Station (Transit Mall Station)
 The southern end of Interstate 710 (Long Beach Freeway)
 Bus service of Greyhound Lines, Amtrak Thruway, Torrance Transit, LADOT, and LACMTA

From 1902 to 1961, the neighborhood was served by the Pacific Electric Long Beach Line.

Education
Downtown Long Beach is within the Long Beach Unified School District.

Architecture

See also
 East Village, Long Beach, California
 Willmore, Long Beach, California
 Long Beach Shoreline Marina
 Neighborhoods of Long Beach, California

References

 
Neighborhoods in Long Beach, California
Tourist attractions in Long Beach, California
Economy of Long Beach, California
Long Beach
Venues of the 2028 Summer Olympics
Olympic cycling venues
Olympic swimming venues
Olympic water polo venues
Olympic triathlon venues